SD Bountiful is an ATD 2909-class tug operated by Serco Marine Services in support of the United Kingdom's Naval Service.

See also
Naval Service (United Kingdom)
List of ships of Serco Marine Services

References

2010 ships
Ships built in the Netherlands
Serco Marine Services (ships)
Tugboats of the United Kingdom